Roger Gavoury (born 7 April 1911, Mello – died 31 May 1961) was Divisional Commissaire of the French National Police and Central Commissaire of Algiers, in addition to duties associated with French Morocco.

He was assassinated by two members of the OAS, Claude Piegts and Albert Dovecar, at the direction of Roger Degueldre. Gavoury was stabbed to death, aged 50, in his studio on the Rue du Docteur Trolard in Algiers on 31 May 1961, eight days after beginning an investigation into the OAS. Piegts and Dovecar were condemned to death on 30 March 1962 by a military tribunal in Paris, and shot by firing squad on 7 June 1962. Degueldre was also condemned to death and was executed on 6 July 1962.

Gavoury started his police career at Hazebrouck in 1936, occupying a variety of posts. He participated in the organization of the national police force of French Morocco between 1956 and 1959. Gavoury was assigned to Algiers beginning in 1960, retaining responsibilities in Morocco. His apartment in Algiers was bombed on 14 April 1961 during the Algerian War. Gavoury was at his family home in Charleville-Mézières at the time of the Algiers putsch of 1961. Gavoury immediately returned to Algiers, where he was killed a month later. Three more commissaires were killed that year in Algiers.

Citations
Chevalier of the Legion of Honour
Croix de la Valeur Militaire with silver star
Posthumously promoted to Controller General of the Sûreté Nationale
Posthumously awarded the Honour medal of the National Police by (Interior) ministerial decree of 29 June 1961.
Citation of the Order of the Nation
His death rendered him eligible for the epitaph Mort pour la France

References

Sources
 This article incorporates text translated from the corresponding French Wikipedia article as of October 18, 2010.

1911 births
1961 deaths
People from Oise
People of the Algerian War
National Police (France)
Chevaliers of the Légion d'honneur
Recipients of the Cross for Military Valour
Male murder victims
Deaths by stabbing in Algeria
French police officers killed in the line of duty
Assassinated police officers
French people of colonial Algeria